The Grizzly Flats Railroad (GFRR) was a 3-foot narrow-gauge heritage railroad owned by Disney animator Ward Kimball at his home in San Gabriel, California. The railroad had  of track, and was operated from 1942 to 2006. It was the first full-size backyard railroad in the United States.

The GFRR was notable for helping Walt Disney rediscover his childhood fascination with trains, which led him to build the Carolwood Pacific Railroad, a ridable miniature railroad in his backyard. The GFRR also influenced the design of the Disneyland Railroad within the Disneyland theme park in Anaheim, California.

The GFRR's rolling stock, including the two steam locomotives owned by Kimball, are now on display at the Southern California Railway Museum (formerly the Orange Empire Railway Museum) in Perris, California. The railroad's depot building and water tower were moved to the Justi Creek Railway, a private railroad owned by John Lasseter.

History

In 1938, Disney animator Ward Kimball, a lifelong railfan, purchased a passenger coach, built in 1881 by the Barney and Smith Car Company, from the Carson and Colorado Railroad. He originally wanted the coach to house his collection of model trains at his home in San Gabriel, California; however, his wife Betty suggested that he should also have a locomotive to pull the coach. A suitable locomotive, the Sidney Dillon, was purchased for $400 from the Nevada Central Railroad, which was selling it for scrap. A 2-6-0 steam locomotive built by Baldwin Locomotive Works in 1881, it was renamed Emma Nevada, after the late 1800s opera star Emma Nevada. Over the course of several years, Kimball, his family, and his friends worked to restore the engine to operating condition. The railroad became operational in 1942. The GFRR became the first full-size backyard railroad in the United States.

In the years to follow, Kimball added a boxcar, a cattle car, a gondola, a caboose, and a second locomotive to the GFRR. The second locomotive was a  steam locomotive built by Baldwin Locomotive Works in 1907, and was originally run on the Waimanalo Sugar Plantation on the Hawaiian island of Oahu. Kimball renamed the locomotive from Pokaa to Chloe, after one of his daughters. As opposed to the Chloe, which burned wood to generate steam, the Emma Nevada burned coal. Kimball was forced to stop running the Emma Nevada in 1967 due to complaints from his neighbors regarding the coal smoke it created. The Chloe pulled a set of train cars custom made by Kimball, consisting of a four-bench open car built around 1975 and two passenger-carrying gondolas built around 1993. Kimball gradually added several structures to the GFRR, including a roundhouse, a water tower, a windmill, and a depot building. The depot building was given to him by his boss, Walt Disney, and was originally used as a set piece for the 1949 Disney film So Dear to My Heart. Kimball died in 2002, but his family continued to operate the GFRR until 2006.

Influences and preservation

Kimball shared his railroad hobby with fellow Disney animator Ollie Johnston, who owned a ridable miniature railroad, and Walt Disney. On October 20, 1945, Disney attended one of the Kimball's "steam-ups", which were parties hosted at their home when the Grizzly Flats Railroad was in operation. During the party, Disney was given the opportunity to drive the GFRR's Emma Nevada locomotive, which was the first time since working as a teenager on the Missouri Pacific Railway that he had been inside a locomotive cab. Disney eventually decided to have his own backyard railroad built, which he named Carolwood Pacific Railroad. His ridable miniature backyard railroad, and the narrow-gauge GFRR, inspired Disney to create the Disneyland Railroad within the Disneyland theme park in Anaheim, California. The Disneyland Railroad's depot building in the Frontierland section of the park was built using the same blueprints for the GFRR's depot building.

In late 1992, Kimball began to donate the GFRR's rolling stock to the Orange Empire Railway Museum in Perris, California. The last of the rolling stock remaining on the GFRR, including the Chloe locomotive, was put on display at the museum in 2007. The GFRR's depot building and water tower were acquired by former Pixar film director John Lasseter, who moved them to his private Justi Creek Railway.

See also
Olomana (locomotive)
Rail transport in Walt Disney Parks and Resorts

References

Bibliography

External links

Southern California Railway Museum (Grizzly Flats Railroad Collection)

1942 establishments in California
2006 disestablishments in California
3 ft gauge railways in the United States
Amusement rides based on rail transport
Backyard railroads in the United States
Heritage railroads in California
Railway lines opened in 1942
Railway lines closed in 2006
San Gabriel, California